William C. Calhoun (born November 4, 1927) is an American former professional basketball player.

Born in San Francisco, California, Calhoun played collegiately for the City College of San Francisco from 1945 to 1946.

He played with the Rochester Royals (1947–51), Baltimore Bullets (1951–52), and Milwaukee Hawks (1952–55) in the NBL, BAA and NBA.

BAA/NBA career statistics

Regular season

Playoffs

References

External links

1927 births
Living people
Amateur Athletic Union men's basketball players
Baltimore Bullets (1944–1954) players
Basketball players from San Francisco
City College of San Francisco Rams men's basketball players
Forwards (basketball)
Guards (basketball)
Milwaukee Hawks players
Rochester Royals players
American men's basketball players